The Albert Einstein ATV, or Automated Transfer Vehicle 004 (ATV-004'''), was a European uncrewed cargo resupply spacecraft, named after the German-born physicist Albert Einstein. It was built to supply the International Space Station (ISS) with propellant, water, air, and dry cargo, and also to reboost the station's altitude with its thrusters. It was the fourth and penultimate ATV to be built, following the Edoardo Amaldi, which was launched in March 2012. Albert Einstein's components were constructed in Turin, Italy, and Bremen, Germany, and underwent final assembly and testing in Bremen in 2012."Arianespace... Feeding Amaldi (Launch)". SatNews. 23 January 2012. Retrieved 11 February 2012. The spacecraft left Bremen for Kourou on 31 August 2012 to begin launch preparations.Albert Einstein was launched on an Ariane 5ES rocket from the Guiana Space Centre in Kourou, French Guiana at 21:52:11 UTC on 5 June 2013. The launch was conducted by Arianespace on behalf of the European Space Agency (ESA). The ATV docked successfully with the ISS at 14:07 UTC (16:07 CEST) on 15 June 2013. After a successful five-month mission, Albert Einstein re-entered the Earth's atmosphere and was destroyed, as planned, on 2 November 2013.

Mission payload
The Albert Einstein supplied the ISS with dry cargo, fuel, water and air to ensure the continued operation of the station. In addition, the ATV used its own thrusters and fuel supply to reboost the ISS, to counteract the drag the residual atmosphere imposes on the station. The total cost of the Albert Einstein mission was approximately 450 million euros.

At the time of its launch, the Albert Einstein held the record for:
Most dry cargo launched in any European spacecraft – ;
Most diverse cargo mix aboard a spacecraft – 1,400 different items;
Largest quantity of late cargo (cargo added only two weeks before launch, while Albert Einstein was already mated to the top of the Ariane 5 rocket) – .
A full cargo breakdown is provided in the following table:

 Source: ESAMission summary

LaunchAlbert Einstein arrived at the Guiana Space Centre in Kourou, French Guiana, in September 2012. It was launched successfully on an Ariane 5ES rocket at 21:52:11 UTC (23:52:11 CEST) on 5 June 2013.

Cruise
After launch, Albert Einstein spent ten days conducting orbital manoeuvres before docking with the ISS. This time frame was chosen for logistical rather than technological reasons – the ATV is capable of docking with the station five days after launch, as demonstrated by the Edoardo Amaldi ATV in 2012, but the launch from Kourou could not occur later, as the launch pad was required for subsequent commercial launches. In addition, docking with the ISS could not occur before 11 June, as the Zvezda port (where the Albert Einstein docked) was occupied by Progress 51. After Progress 51 departed on 11 June, cameras on the ISS checked the Zvezda docking port to ensure that no damage was caused when Progress 51 docked with the station, as it had a stuck navigation antenna which could have potentially damaged the docking port."'Albert Einstein' in Space: Europe Launches Cargo Spacecraft Named for Scientist". Space.com. 5 June 2013. Retrieved 6 June 2013. No damage to the docking port was detected, and so the ATV's docking proceeded as planned.

Docking
The ATV docked successfully with the ISS at 14:07 UTC (16:07 CEST) on 15 June 2013 and the hatch was opened on 18 June. The hatch opening was delayed by a day due to concerns raised by Roscosmos that the cargo had not been disinfected satisfactorily.

Reboost and docked operations
On 19 June 2013, Albert Einstein conducted its first reboost of the ISS, performing a 407-second burn which provided a delta-v change of 1.0 m/s to the station. A further reboost was undertaken on 10 July 2013, where a burn of just less than 10 minutes provided a delta-v change of 1.45 m/s; this operation consumed  of propellant. By 12 July 2013, all the dry cargo had been unloaded from Albert Einstein, allowing the ATV to be filled with waste for removal from the station.

On 23 and 28 July Albert Einstein suffered a transient fault with two of its three computers, numbers 2 and 3. While only a single computer was required to operate the ATV, two out of the three were required for any "mission critical" operations. However, by 29 July a restart had been performed on both units, bringing all three of the ATV's computers back on-line without impacting the mission schedule. Transfer of fuel and oxidiser from the ATV to the Russian segment of the ISS took place on 1 August 2013 in an operation that took approximately 1.5 hours; this fuel allowed the ISS to adjust its orbit in the absence of docked vessels to perform reboosts. The pipelines were then purged to avoid any complications during Albert Einsteins undocking from the ISS.

End of mission and deorbitAlbert Einstein'' undocked safely from the ISS at 08:55 UTC (09:55 CET) on 28 October 2013; it then conducted a series of orbital adjustments to allow the ISS astronauts to clearly observe its re-entry. On 2 November, it re-entered Earth's atmosphere and burnt up, along with a payload of ISS waste, over the Pacific Ocean.

ATV missions

References

External links

ATV 4 official site, mission brochure and mission blog via ESA.

Automated Transfer Vehicles
Albert Einstein
Spacecraft launched in 2013
Spacecraft which reentered in 2013
Supply vehicles for the International Space Station